Amin or Amine (Arabic: أمين amīn) is an Arabic male given name, meaning "devoted, honest, straightforward, trusty, worth of belief (believable), loyal, faithful, obedient".  

The Arabic female form of Amin is Amina. 

The name has been loaned into a few other languages, namely ones spoken by Muslim populations. In Persian ( امین‌ amīn) it has the same meaning. The Turkish written form of the name is Emin. 

Other spellings include Ameen and Amien.

Amin

Regnal name
Al-Amin (787–813), also known as Abū Mūsā Muḥammad ibn Hārūn al-Rashīd, better known by his regnal name Al-Amin, the sixth Abbasid Caliph, ruling from 809 until 813

Given name
Amin (Qing dynasty) (1585–1640), Manchu noble and political leader
Amin al-Rihani (1876–1940), Lebanese author
Amin Ahsan Islahi (1904–1997), Pakistani Muslim scholar
Amin al-Hafiz (1921–2009), Syrian leader
Amin al-Hafez (Lebanon) (1926–2009), Lebanese politician
Amin Howeidi (1921–2009), Egyptian military officer and politician
Amin Yunis al Husseini (1929–2016), Jordanian politician
Amin Mekki Medani (1939–2018), Sudanese human rights lawyer and political activist
Amine Gemayel (born 1942), President of Lebanon from 1982 to 1988
Amin Maalouf (born 1949), Lebanese author
Amin Osman (1898–1946), Egyptian politician
Amin Hossein Rahimi (born 1968), Iranian politician
Amien Rais (born 1944), Indonesian politician
Amin Abu Rashid (born 1966/1967), Palestinian-Dutch Hamas leader
Amin Shah, Manipur politician
Amin Stevens (born 1990), American professional basketball player for Elitzur Kiryat Ata in Israel

Middle name
Mohammad Amin al-Husayni (c. 1897–1974), Mufti of Jerusalem
Mohamed Amin Didi (1910–1954), president of the Maldives from 1953 to 1954
Sami Amin Al-Arian (born 1958), Palestinian political activist, computer engineering professor in the United States, convicted of aiding a terrorist organization

Surname / family name
Adam Amin (born 1986), American sportscaster
Ahmad Amin (1954–1886), Egyptian historian and writer
Ash Amin (born 1955), British geographer
Ehab Amin (born 1995), Egyptian basketball player
Esperidião Amin (born 1947), Brazilian politician
Hafizullah Amin (1929–1979), 2nd General Secretary of the People's Democratic Party of Afghanistan
Hájí Amín (1831–1928), one of the 19 Apostles of Bahá'u'lláh, of the Bahá'í Faith
Haron Amin (1969–2015), Afghan diplomat 
Hassan Amin (disambiguation), several people 
Idi Amin (1925–2003), President of Uganda from 1971 to 1979
Jabar Amin (born 1959), Swedish politician
Khadija Amin, Bangladesh Nationalist Party politician and Member of Parliament
Mohamed Amin (1943–1996) (also known as 'Mo'), Kenyan photojournalist and entrepreneur
Riaz Amin (born 1998), English professional martial artist
Samir Amin (1931–2018), Egyptian French economist and political scientist

Amine

Mononym 
Amine (French singer), Moroccan-born French R&B singer, full name Amine Mounder

Given name 
Amine Aksas (born 1983), Algerian football player
Amine Amamou, Moroccan football player
Amine Bannour (born 1990), Tunisian handball player
Amine Belaïd (born 1988), Algerian football player
Amine Boukhlouf (born 1984), Algerian football player
Amine Boushaki (born 1982), Algerian judoka
Amine Chermiti (born 1987), Tunisian football player
Amine Pierre Gemayel (born 1942), President of Lebanon from 1982 to 1988 and leader of Kataeb Party
Amine Gouiri (born 2000), French footballer
Amine Gülşe Özil (born 1993), Turkish-Swedish model
Amine Harit (born 1997), Moroccan footballer
Amine El Khalifi (born  1983), Moroccan man arrested by the FBI for allegedly plotting to carry out a suicide bombing on the US Capitol
Amine Laâlou (born 1982), Moroccan middle-distance runner
Amine Lecomte (born 1990), French-Moroccan football player
Amine Linganzi (born 1989), Congolese football player
Amine Ltaïef (born 1984), Tunisian football player
Amine El Manaoui (born 1991), Moroccan middle-distance runner
Amine Mezbar (also known as Adel Tobbicchi), Canadian citizen arrested and charged with terrorism, following an alleged plot conspiring to blow up the American embassy in Paris in June 2002; later found not guilty of the charge in a Dutch court
Amine M'raihi, part of the Tunisian oud/qanun musical duo Amine and Hamza
Amine Rzig (born 1980), Tunisian basketball player
Amine Touahri (born 1989), Algerian football player

Middle name 
Fayçal Amine Abourrass, Yemeni diplomat
Mohamed Amine Aoudia (born 1987), Algerian football player
Mohamed El-Amine Souef (born 1962), Comorian diplomat and government minister
Pierre Amine Gemayel (1972–2006), Lebanese politician, MP and government minister
Mohammed Amine El Bourkadi (born 1985), Moroccan football player
Mohamed Amine Dennoun (born 1986), French-Algerian football player
Mohamed Amine Khamsi (born 1959), American/Moroccan mathematician
Mohamed Amine Najmi (born 1981), Moroccan football player
Mohamed Amine Ouadahi, Algerian boxer
Mohamed Amine Sbihi (born 1954), Moroccan politician
Mohammed Amine Smaili, Moroccan interfaith theologian
Youssouf Amine Elalamy (born 1961), Moroccan writer

Surname 
Hussein Amine (born 1985), Lebanese football player
Khalil Amine, Moroccan scientist
Myles Amine, Sammarinese American freestyle wrestler
Nazem Amine, Lebanese wrestler

See also
 Amin (disambiguation)
 Amin al-Dawla (disambiguation), an honorific title
 Iman (Islam)

Surnames
Arabic masculine given names
Pakistani masculine given names
Malaysian masculine given names
Bengali Muslim surnames